Luiz Fernando Moraes dos Santos (born 16 October 1996), known as Luiz Fernando, is a Brazilian professional footballer who plays as an attacking midfielder for Atlético Goianense, on loan from Botafogo. Previously he had played for Atlético Goianiense and Grêmio.

Career statistics

Honours

Club
Botafogo
 Campeonato Carioca: 2018

Grêmio
Campeonato Gaúcho: 2020, 2021

References

External links

1996 births
Living people
Sportspeople from Tocantins
Brazilian footballers
Association football midfielders
Campeonato Brasileiro Série A players
Campeonato Brasileiro Série B players
Atlético Clube Goianiense players
Botafogo de Futebol e Regatas
Grêmio Foot-Ball Porto Alegrense players